The 1973 Texas Tech Red Raiders football team represented Texas Tech University in the Southwest Conference (SWC) during the 1973 NCAA Division I football season. In their fourth season under head coach Jim Carlen, the Red Raiders compiled an 11–1 record (6–1 against conference opponents), finished in second place in the SWC, defeated Tennessee in the 1973 Gator Bowl, were ranked No. 11 in the final AP Poll, and outscored opponents by a combined total of 342 to 187. The team's statistical leaders included Joe Barnes with 978 passing yards and 568 rushing yards and Andre Tillman with 428 receiving yards. The team played its home games at Clifford B. & Audrey Jones Stadium.

Schedule

Personnel

Season summary

Utah

New Mexico

at Texas

External links

References

Texas Tech
Texas Tech Red Raiders football seasons
Gator Bowl champion seasons
Texas Tech Red Raiders football